Thrills is a Canadian brand of chewing gum.

Thrills may also refer to:

 Thrills (Andrew Bird's Bowl of Fire album), 1998
 Thrills (Ellen Allien album), 2005
 "Thrills", a 2018 song by Spacey Jane
 "Thrills", a 1978 song by Stewart Copeland
 "Thrills", a song by LCD Soundsystem from the 2005 album LCD Soundsystem

Other uses
 The Thrills, an Irish indie rock band

See also
 Thrill (disambiguation)